Main page: List of Canadian plants by family

Families:
A | B | C | D | E | F | G | H | I J K | L | M | N | O | P Q | R | S | T | U V W | X Y Z

Gentianaceae 

 Bartonia paniculata — twining bartonia
 Bartonia virginica — yellow screwstem
 Centaurium exaltatum — tall centaury
 Centaurium muehlenbergii — Monterey centaury
 Frasera albicaulis — purple green-gentian
 Frasera caroliniensis (= Swertia caroliniensis) — Carolina gentian
 Gentiana affinis — prairie gentian
 Gentiana alba — yellow gentian
 Gentiana andrewsii — fringe-top bottle gentian
 Gentiana calycosa — explorer's gentian
 Gentiana clausa — closed gentian
 Gentiana douglasiana — swamp gentian
 Gentiana fremontii — moss gentian
 Gentiana glauca — glaucous gentian
 Gentiana linearis — narrowleaf gentian
 Gentiana nivalis — snow gentian
 Gentiana platypetala — broadpetal gentian
 Gentiana prostrata — pygmy gentian
 Gentiana puberulenta — downy gentian
 Gentiana rubricaulis — closed gentian
 Gentiana sceptrum — Pacific gentian
 Gentiana x billingtonii
 Gentiana x grandilacustris
 Gentiana x pallidocyanea
 Gentianella amarella — northern gentian
 Gentianella propinqua — four-part gentian
 Gentianella quinquefolia — stiff gentian
 Gentianella tenella — Dane's gentian
 Gentianopsis crinita — fringed gentian
 Gentianopsis detonsa — sheared gentian
 Gentianopsis macounii — Macoun's gentian
 Gentianopsis nesophila — island gentian
 Gentianopsis procera — lesser fringed gentian
 Gentianopsis victorinii — Victorin's gentian
 Halenia deflexa — spurred gentian
 Lomatogonium rotatum — marsh felwort
 Sabatia kennedyana — Plymouth gentian
 Swertia caroliniensis — Carolina gentian
 Swertia perennis — felwort

Geocalycaceae 

 Geocalyx graveolens
 Harpanthus drummondii
 Harpanthus flotovianus
 Harpanthus scutatus

Geraniaceae 

 Geranium bicknellii — Bicknell's northern crane's-bill
 Geranium carolinianum — Carolina crane's-bill
 Geranium erianthum — northern crane's-bill
 Geranium maculatum — wild crane's-bill
 Geranium oreganum — Oregon crane's-bill
 Geranium richardsonii — Richardson's geranium
 Geranium robertianum — herb-Robert
 Geranium viscosissimum — sticky geranium

Grimmiaceae 

 Coscinodon calyptratus
 Coscinodon cribrosus — copper coscinodon
 Dryptodon patens
 Grimmia affinis
 Grimmia anodon
 Grimmia anomala
 Grimmia atrata
 Grimmia donniana
 Grimmia elatior
 Grimmia elongata
 Grimmia funalis
 Grimmia hartmanii
 Grimmia hermannii
 Grimmia incurva
 Grimmia laevigata
 Grimmia mollis
 Grimmia montana
 Grimmia olneyi
 Grimmia ovalis
 Grimmia pilifera
 Grimmia plagiopodia
 Grimmia poecilostoma
 Grimmia pulvinata
 Grimmia reflexidens
 Grimmia tenerrima
 Grimmia teretinervis
 Grimmia torngakiana
 Grimmia torquata
 Grimmia trichophylla
 Grimmia unicolor
 Jaffueliobryum raui
 Jaffueliobryum wrightii
 Racomitrium aciculare
 Racomitrium affine
 Racomitrium aquaticum
 Racomitrium canescens — silver moss
 Racomitrium depressum
 Racomitrium elongatum
 Racomitrium ericoides
 Racomitrium fasciculare
 Racomitrium heterostichum
 Racomitrium lanuginosum — woolly moss
 Racomitrium lawtonae
 Racomitrium macounii
 Racomitrium microcarpon
 Racomitrium muticum
 Racomitrium occidentale
 Racomitrium pacificum
 Racomitrium panschii
 Racomitrium pygmaeum
 Racomitrium sudeticum
 Racomitrium varium
 Schistidium agassizii
 Schistidium andreaeopsis
 Schistidium apocarpum
 Schistidium boreale
 Schistidium confertum
 Schistidium crassipilum
 Schistidium frigidum
 Schistidium heterophyllum
 Schistidium lancifolium
 Schistidium maritimum
 Schistidium obtusifolium
 Schistidium pulchrum
 Schistidium pulvinatum
 Schistidium rivulare
 Schistidium robustum
 Schistidium tenerum
 Schistidium trichodon

Grossulariaceae 

 Ribes acerifolium — Howell's gooseberry
 Ribes americanum — wild black currant
 Ribes aureum — golden currant
 Ribes bracteosum — California black currant
 Ribes cereum — wax currant
 Ribes cynosbati — prickly gooseberry
 Ribes divaricatum — straggly gooseberry
 Ribes glandulosum — skunk currant
 Ribes hirtellum — smooth gooseberry
 Ribes hudsonianum — northern black currant
 Ribes inerme — whitestem gooseberry
 Ribes lacustre — bristly black currant
 Ribes laxiflorum — trailing black currant
 Ribes lobbii — pioneer gooseberry
 Ribes montigenum — alpine prickly gooseberry
 Ribes oxyacanthoides — Canada gooseberry
 Ribes sanguineum — winter currant
 Ribes triste — swamp red currant
 Ribes viscosissimum — sticky gooseberry
 Ribes watsonianum — Watson's gooseberry

Gymnomitriaceae 

 Gymnomitrion apiculatum
 Gymnomitrion concinnatum
 Gymnomitrion corallioides
 Gymnomitrion pacificum
 Marsupella alpina
 Marsupella arctica
 Marsupella boeckii
 Marsupella brevissima
 Marsupella commutata
 Marsupella condensata
 Marsupella emarginata
 Marsupella paroica
 Marsupella revoluta
 Marsupella sparsifolia
 Marsupella sphacelata
 Marsupella ustulata

Canada,family,G